José Pinto Peixoto (November 9, 1922 – December 6, 1996) was a Portuguese meteorologist. As a part of Victor Starr's research group, including Abraham H. Oort and Ed Lorenz, and then later as director of the Geophysical Institute de Luis at the University of Lisbon, he contributed to theories of the global atmospheric circulation. 

Peixoto is best known for his textbook, Physics of Climate, written in conjunction with Oort. 

Career Honors
 Professor of Physics, Thermodynamics, and Theoretical Meteorology at the University of Lisbon
 Director of the Geophysical Institute de Luis
 President of the National Academy of Sciences of Lisbon
 Executive Committee Member of the European Science Foundation

References

External links
Portuguese Wikipedia entry

1922 births
1996 deaths
Portuguese meteorologists